Crossobamon eversmanni, also known commonly as the comb-toed gecko, is a species of Asian gecko, a lizard in the family Gekkonidae.

Etymology
The specific name, eversmanni, is in honor of Russian-German entomologist Alexander Eduard Friedrich Eversmann.

Geographic range
C. eversmanni is found in Iran, Pakistan, and several other countries of Central Asia.

Habitat

Behavior
C. eversmanni is terrestrial, nocturnal, and lives in burrows.

Reproduction
C. eversmanni is oviparous. A sexually mature female may lay 2–3 clutches per year, with 1–2 eggs in each clutch.

Subspecies
Two subspecies are recognized as being valid, including the nominotypical subspecies.
Crossobamon eversmanni eversmanni 
Crossobamon eversmanni lumsdenii 

Nota bene: A trinomial authority in parentheses indicates that the subspecies was originally described in a genus other than Crossobamon.

References

Further reading
Boulenger GA (1887). Catalogue of the Lizards in the British Museum (Natural History). Second Edition. Volume III. Lacertidæ, Gerrhosauridæ, Scincidæ, Anelytropidæ, Dibamidæ, Chamæleontidæ. London: Trustees of the British Museum (Natural History). (Taylor and Francis, printers). xii + 575 pp. + Plates I-XL. (Stenodactylus lumsdenii, new species, p. 479).
Wiegmann AFA (1834). Herpetologia Mexicana, seu descriptio amphibiorum Novae Hispaniae, quae itineribus comitis de Sack, Ferdinandi Deppe et Chr. Guil. Schiede in Museum Zoologicum Berolinense pervenerunt, Pars prima, saurorum species amplectens. Adiecto systematis saurorum prodromo, additisque multis in hunc amphibiorum ordinem observationibus. Berlin: C.G. Lüderitz. vi + 54 pp. + Plates I-X. (Gymnodactylus eversmanni, new species, p. 19). (in Latin).

ev
Reptiles described in 1834